Marc Goossens, nicknamed The Goose  (born 30 November 1969), is a Belgian professional racing driver that currently competes in the NASCAR Whelen Euro Series, driving the No. 14 Chevrolet Camaro for SpeedHouse in the EuroNASCAR PRO class.

Racing career
Goossens drove full-time in Formula 3000 from 1994 to 1996 and part-time from 1999 to 2001. In between he drove in endurance races and is a veteran of the 24 Hours of Le Mans. From 2002 to 2005 he then raced in FIA GT. In 2007 and 2008 he drove a Riley-Pontiac Daytona Prototype at the Rolex Sports Car Series, scoring two wins with teammate Jim Matthews.

He also finished 9th in his first NASCAR Busch Series start at Autodromo Hermanos Rodriguez in 2006 for Robert Yates Racing in their No. 90 Ford. Goossens returned to Yates later that year to make his NASCAR Cup Series debut in August of that year at Watkins Glen International in the No. 90, but crashed out and finished 43rd. Goossens made another Cup start in 2007 at Infineon Raceway, driving the No. 91 Toyota for Riley-D'Hondt Motorsports. He was running well until a mechanical failure dropped him to 36th. He was set to make another start in the same car at Watkins Glen, but with rain in the forecast for qualifying and the No. 91 only being a part-time team, the team withdrew as they would have missed the race.

Goossens holds the record of the most wins in 24 Hours of Zolder with six (1997, 1998, 2005, 2007, 2014, 2016) race along with Anthony Kumpen. Also, he won the Belcar in 2005 with a Chevrolet Corvette C5R and in 2011 with a Porsche 911 GT 3 R

Goossens competed at the GTE Pro class of the 2011 Le Mans Series with a ProSpeed Competition Porsche 911, partnering with Marco Holzer.

In 2012 he was hired by the Chrysler Corporation's SRT Motorsports racing team to drive a Viper GT Le Mans in the American Le Mans Series. With Dominik Farnbacher as teammate in 2013, he scored a class win and three podiums. Continuing with SRT in the 2014 United SportsCar Championship, the Belgian scored six class podiums. In 2015 he continued with Viper but in the GT Daytona class, winning the Six Hours at the Glen. In 2016 he drove a Coyote Corvette Daytona Prototype for VisitFlorida Racing with Ryan Dalziel, finishing third at the 24 Hours of Daytona. He continued with VisitFlorida in the 2017 IMSA SportsCar Championship.

Goossens later competed in the NASCAR Whelen Euro Series, driving for Braxx Racing and CAAL Racing.

Racing record

Complete International Formula 3000 results
(key) (Races in bold indicate pole position) (Races
in italics indicate fastest lap)

24 Hours of Le Mans results

NASCAR
(key) (Bold – Pole position awarded by qualifying time. Italics – Pole position earned by points standings or practice time. * – Most laps led.)

Nextel Cup Series

Busch Series

Whelen Euro Series – EuroNASCAR PRO
(key) (Bold – Pole position. Italics – Fastest lap. * – Most laps led. ^ – Most positions gained)

* Season still in progress.

Complete IMSA SportsCar Championship results
(key)(Races in bold indicate pole position)

References

External links
 
 
 Career summary on Driver Database

1969 births
24 Hours of Daytona drivers
24 Hours of Le Mans drivers
American Le Mans Series drivers
Belgian racing drivers
FIA GT Championship drivers
Formula Ford drivers
Formula Nippon drivers
International Formula 3000 drivers
European Le Mans Series drivers
Living people
NASCAR drivers
Rolex Sports Car Series drivers
People from Geel
Blancpain Endurance Series drivers
FIA World Endurance Championship drivers
WeatherTech SportsCar Championship drivers
24 Hours of Spa drivers
Arden International drivers
Robert Yates Racing drivers
Sportspeople from Antwerp Province
Karting World Championship drivers
Murphy Prototypes drivers
DAMS drivers
Team Astromega drivers
Scuderia Coloni drivers
Nordic Racing drivers
Nismo drivers
Meyer Shank Racing drivers